The 2022–23 UCF Knights men's basketball team represented the University of Central Florida during the 2022–23 NCAA Division I men's basketball season. The Knights compete as members of the American Athletic Conference. The Knights, in the program's 54th season of basketball, were led by seventh-year head coach Johnny Dawkins and played their home games at the Addition Financial Arena on the university's main campus in Orlando, Florida. They finished the season 18–14, 8–10 in AAC Play to finish in 7th place. They defeated SMU in the First Round of the AAC Tournament before losing in the quarterfinals to Memphis in the quarterfinals. The Knights received an at-large bid to the NIT, where they defeated Florida in the first round before losing in the second round to Oregon.

This was also the last season UCF played in the American Athletic Conference before moving to the Big 12 Conference.

Previous season
The Knights finished the 2021–22 season 18–12 overall and 9–9 in AAC play to finish in sixth place. They defeated South Florida in the first round of the AAC tournament before losing to Memphis in the quarterfinals.

Offseason

Departures

Incoming transfers

2022 Recruiting class

2023 Recruiting class

Roster

Schedule and results

|-
!colspan=12 style=|Non-conference regular season

|-
!colspan=12 style=|AAC regular season

|-
!colspan=12 style=|AAC tournament

|-
!colspan=12 style=|NIT

Source

References

UCF Knights men's basketball seasons
UCF
UCF Knights men's basketball
UCF Knights men's basketball
UCF